Delightful Forest is a 1972 Hong Kong film directed by Chang Cheh.

Cast

Ti Lung
Tin Ching
Zhu Mu
Lee Man Tai
Chiang Nan
Nam Wai Lit
Wong Kwong Yue
Wong Ching Ho
Yue Fung
Kong Ling

References

External links
 

1972 films
Hong Kong action films
1972 action films
1970s Mandarin-language films
Films directed by Chang Cheh
Films based on Water Margin
1970s Hong Kong films